Josh Ali (born March 3, 1999) is an American football wide receiver for the Atlanta Falcons of the National Football League (NFL).

Early life and education
Ali was born on March 3, 1999, in Miami, Florida. He attended Chaminade-Madonna College Preparatory School and was a four-year starter in football, recording as a senior 43 receptions for 805 yards and five touchdowns. An all-state selection, Ali was a three-star recruit and elected to play college football at Kentucky over offers from UCF and Utah, as well as several other schools.

As a true freshman at Kentucky in 2017, Ali appeared in nine games and recorded five receptions for 25 yards. The following season, he caught 10 passes for 115 yards and scored his first collegiate touchdown. As a junior, Ali started 13 games and recorded 23 catches for 233 yards and three touchdowns. That season, he played a key role in the Wildcats' victory in the Belk Bowl, making a crucial fourth down reception and later scoring the game-winning touchdown with 15 seconds to play.

In the 2020 season, Ali appeared in 11 games and recorded 473 receiving yards and a touchdown off of 54 receptions. After being given an extra year of eligibility due to the COVID-19 pandemic, he opted to return to the team in 2021 for a fifth season. That year, he posted 601 receiving yards and three touchdowns on 41 catches while appearing in 10 games. Ali missed the final game of the season, the Citrus Bowl, after being involved in a car accident.

Professional career
After going unselected in the 2022 NFL Draft, Ali was invited to the rookie minicamp of the Atlanta Falcons, but was not initially signed. He received a tryout on August 25, and six days later was signed to the practice squad. Ali was elevated to the active roster for the Falcons' Week 17 game with the Arizona Cardinals, and made his NFL debut in the game. He signed a reserve/future contract on January 9, 2023.

Personal life
Ali's father, Faheem, played college football at Louisiana Tech and later was in the Arena Football League (AFL). Ali began writing a children's book series in 2021.

References

External links
Atlanta Falcons bio
Kentucky Wildcats bio

1999 births
Living people
American football wide receivers
Players of American football from Miami
Chaminade-Madonna College Preparatory School alumni
Kentucky Wildcats football players
Atlanta Falcons players